3 FM is a privately owned radio station in Accra, the capital of Ghana. The radio station is owned by Media General Radio Limited, which forms part of Media General, a media and communications company which owns several television and radio stations in Ghana.

References 

Radio stations in Ghana
Mass media in Accra